Nguyễn Thanh Thảo (born 13 May 1995) is a Vietnamese footballer who plays as a defender for Becamex Bình Dương in the V.League 1.

Career

Becamex Binh Duong
After joining the club in 2017, he made his league debut on 19 November 2017 in a 4-0 victory over Long An.

Honours
Becamex Bình Dương
Vietnamese National Cup: 2018; Runner-up 2017
Vietnamese Super Cup: Runner-up 2019

References

1995 births
Living people
Vietnamese footballers
Becamex Binh Duong FC players
V.League 1 players
Association football defenders